Hadda may refer to:

Hadda, Afghanistan
Hadda, Pakistan
Hadda, Sana'a, Yemen
Abdeljalil Hadda
Rib-Hadda
Hadda Brooks
Yapa-Hadda
Hadda bettle - Henosepilachna vigintioctopunctata

See also
 Hada (disambiguation)
 Haida (disambiguation)